Oddcast may refer to:
Oddcast (company), a New York City-based developer and provider of the SitePal service
Edcast or Oddcast, an open-source audio encoder